William Henry Ashdown (27 December 1898 – 15 September 1979) was an English professional cricketer. He is one of a very few men who played first-class cricket before the First World War and after the Second World War.

Ashdown was born in Bromley in Kent. He first played first-class cricket in 1914, playing for Gerry Weigall's XI against Oxford University in The Parks, aged 15. During World War I he served in a reserve battalion of the Rifle Brigade on home defence duties.

Playing for Kent County Cricket Club after the First World War, Ashdown scored 39 centuries, including two triple-centuries with a highest score of 332 against Essex in 1934. This remains Kent's highest individual score. His second triple-century for the county was scored in 1935 and is one of only two Kent batsman to have scored a triple-century whilst playing of the county. He scored more than 1,000 runs in 11 seasons of county cricket. He was also successful as a bowler, taking 602 wickets at a bowling average of 32.47. He was awarded his county cap in 1922 and retired in 1937. He returned to play a final first-class match in 1947, aged 48, for Maurice Leyland's XI against the Rest of England at Harrogate when he scored 42 and 40 and took five wickets for 73 runs.

He became an umpire after retiring from first-class cricket, and stood in two Tests against New Zealand in 1949 and one against the West Indies in 1950. He stepped down from the umpire's list resume his playing career as captain of Leicestershire 2nd XI until he was 55, doubling up as their coach and scorer. He died in Rugby, Warwickshire, aged 80.

Notes

References

External links

1898 births
1979 deaths
People from Bromley
English cricketers
Kent cricketers
English Test cricket umpires
Players cricketers
English cricketers of 1919 to 1945
H. D. G. Leveson Gower's XI cricketers
North v South cricketers
L. H. Tennyson's XI cricket team
M. Leyland's XI cricketers
Cricket scorers
British Army personnel of World War I
Rifle Brigade soldiers